Nnamdi Innocent (born 30 September 1980) is a Nigerian Paralympic powerlifter. He represented Nigeria at the 2016 Summer Paralympics in Rio de Janeiro, Brazil and he won the bronze medal in the men's 72 kg event. In 2021, he did not perform a successful lift in the men's 72 kg event at the 2020 Summer Paralympics in Tokyo, Japan.

He won the gold medal in the men's 72 kg event at the 2018 African Para Powerlifting Championships held in Algiers, Algeria. At the 2019 World Para Powerlifting Championships held in Nur-Sultan, Kazakhstan, he won the bronze medal in the men's 72 kg event.

He won the bronze medal in the men's lightweight event at the 2022 Commonwealth Games held in Birmingham, England.

Results

References

External links 
 

Living people
1980 births
Place of birth missing (living people)
Male powerlifters
Paralympic powerlifters of Nigeria
Nigerian powerlifters
Powerlifters at the 2016 Summer Paralympics
Powerlifters at the 2020 Summer Paralympics
Medalists at the 2016 Summer Paralympics
Paralympic bronze medalists for Nigeria
Paralympic medalists in powerlifting
Commonwealth Games bronze medallists for Nigeria
Powerlifters at the 2022 Commonwealth Games
21st-century Nigerian people
Commonwealth Games medallists in powerlifting
Medallists at the 2022 Commonwealth Games